Larvik Turn & Idrettsforening is a Norwegian sports club that does football, handball, athletics, wrestling, and gymnastics.

The club was founded as early as 1865, and has been playing football since 1906. The football team was at its best during the 1950s, when it won the Norwegian Premier League three times; in 1953, 1955, and 1956. The club's only cup final appearance came in 1956, but this match was lost 2–1 to Skeid. Former Norwegian internationals Gunnar Thoresen, Hallvar Thoresen, Tom Sundby and Gunnar Halle have all played for Larvik Turn & I.F.

The most prominent representative of the athletics section is Lars Martin Kaupang, who had the Norwegian record in 1500 metres with 3:37.4 minutes from 30 June 1976 until 29 April 2012.

League participations
First Level: 1937–1948 (League wasn't played between 1939 and 1947 due to German invasion), 1952–1962

Second Level: 1948–1952, 1963, 1973–1977 (5 seasons)

Third Level: 1964–1967 (4 seasons), 1970–1972 (3 seasons), 1978–1982 (5 seasons), 1988, 1997–1998 (2 seasons)

Fourth Level: 1968–1969 (2 seasons), 1983–1987 (5 seasons), 1989–1996 (8 seasons), 1999–

References

External links
Official site 
Norwegian clubs' divisional movements 

1865 establishments in Norway
Athletics clubs in Norway
Football clubs in Norway
Larvik
Sport in Vestfold og Telemark
Sports clubs established in 1865